Andy Spence is an English football manager who last managed Everton L.F.C.

Management career

First stint with Everton
The first position Spence held with Everton was a stint as director of the Everton Centre of Excellence, which is an academy program tasked with training girls between the ages of Under-9s through Under-17s.

By 2004, Spence began his Everton managing career as an assistant to Mo Marley. During his time as an assistant, Spence helped the club win the 2008 League Cup and the 2010 FA Cup.

On 14 November 2012 Marley stepped down at the end of the last campaign, naming Spence as the new first team manager. After three seasons with the Blues, Spence stepped down, citing the club's need to move forward after being relegated at the conclusion of the 2014 season after 21 seasons in the top flight and struggling form in the FA WSL 2. He would be succeeded by Nicola Anderson and retake his position at the club's Centre of Excellence.

Return as Everton manager
After six months, Spence was re-appointed manager of Everton L.F.C. Spence would lead Everton to back-to-back third place WSL 2 finishes. In 2017, the FA WSL ran an interim season to re-align the season calendars between February and May called the FA WSL Spring Series. This interim season would not compete for promotion or relegation ahead of the 2017-18 season. Under Spence, Everton won the Spring Series with 7 wins from 9 matches.

Prior to the 2017-18 season, Notts County of the WSL 1 folded prior to the Spring Series prompting the FA to invite FA WSL 2 clubs to apply and fill the vacancy. Spence's Everton was awarded the invitation back into the top flight on 9 June 2017, and would compete in the WSL 1 for the 2017-18 season.

After going winless through six matches in the FA WSL to open the 2018-19 campaign, Spence "left his role" as manager with Jennifer Herst being appointed interim manager.

Managerial statistics

All competitive league games (league and domestic cup) and international matches (not including friendlies) are included.

Honors

Manager

Everton Ladies
FA WSL 2 Spring Series: Winners (1): 2017

Individual
FA WSL Coach of the Year: 2017

References

External links

Andy Spence coach profile at EvertonFC.com

Living people
Women's Super League managers
Year of birth missing (living people)
English football managers